Cercopidae are the largest family of Cercopoidea, a xylem-feeding insect group, commonly called froghoppers or spittlebugs. They belong to the hemipteran suborder Auchenorrhyncha.

Genera

[[File:Leptataspis sp. - Flickr - Pasha Kirillov.jpg|thumb|right|upright|Leptataspis'''' sp.]]
A-CAbidama Aeneolamia 
†Allocercopis Alluaudensia Amberana Ambonga Anoplosnastus Anyllis Aracamunia Aufidus Augustohahnia Baetkia Baibarana Bandisia 
†Berro Blötea Bourgoinrana Bradypteroscarta Callitettix Caloscarta Carachata Carpentiera Catrimania Cercopicesa Cercopis 
†Cercopites Chinana Choconta 
†Cicadellites Clypeocarta Colsa Considia Cosmoscarta 

D-F

†Dawsonites Delassor Deois Deoisella Dulitana Ectemnocarta Ectemnonotops Ectemnonotum 
†Eocercopidium Eoscarta Eubakeriella Euglobiceps Euryaulax Euryliterna Ferorhinella Funkhouseria 

G-IGuarania Gynopygocarta Gynopygoplax Haematoloma Haematoscarta Helioscarta Hemiaufidus Hemibandusia Hemicercopis Hemieoscarta Hemiliterna Hemiplagiophleboptena Hemitomaspis Hemitrichoscarta Hemitriecphora Heteroliterna Homalogrypota Homalostethus Huaina Hyalotomaspis Hyboscarta Iphirhina Ischnorhina Isozulia 

J-L Jacobsoniella Janssensia Jeanneliensia Kanaima Kanoscarta Kanozata Korobona Kotozata Kuscarta Laccogrypota Lamprochlamys Lehina Leptataspis Leptoliterna Leptynis Lieftinckana Liorhinella Literna 
†Lithecphora Locris Locrites Luederwaldtia Lujana 

M-OMachadoa Mahanarva Makonaima Marcion Maxantonia 
†Megacercopis Megastethodon Mioscarta Monecphora Moultoniella Neocercopis Neolaccogrypota Neomonecphora Neoporpacella Neosphenorhina Nesaphrogeneia Nesaulax 
†Nisocercopis Notozulia Okiscarta Olcotomaspis Opistharsostethus Orodamnis Orthorhinella Oxymegaspis 

P-RPachacanthocnemis Pachypterinella 
†Palecphora Panabrus Paphnutius Paracercopis 
†Parafitopteryx Paraliterna Paralocris Paramioscarta Paramonecphora Parapisidice Petyllis Phlebarcys Phymatostetha Pisianax Pisidice Plagiophleboptena Poeciloterpa Pogonorhinella Porpacella 
†Prinecphora Prosapia Pseudaufidus Pseudeoscarta Pseudocercopis Pseudomachaerota Radioscarta Rhinastria Rhinaulax 

S-USchistogonia Serapita Simeliria Simorhina Sphenoclypeana Sphenorhina Stenaulophrys 
†Stenecphora 
†Stenolocris  Straelenia Suracarta Synavea Tadascarta Tapaiuna Telogmometopius Thoodzata Tiodus Tomaspis Tomaspisina Tomaspisinella Trichoscarta Triecphorella Trigonoschema Tropidorhinella Typeschata 

V-ZVigilantius Villiersana Vorago Zuata Zulia''

References 

 
Cercopoidea
Auchenorrhyncha families